Willie Tennyson West (born May 1, 1938) is an American football former defensive back. He played for nine seasons professionally: for the NFL St. Louis Cardinals; and for the American Football League's Buffalo Bills, Denver Broncos, New York Jets, and Miami Dolphins.  He was an AFL All-Star for the Bills in 1963, and for the Dolphins in 1966.  On November 2, 2007, he was inducted into University of Oregon Sports Hall of Fame.

See also
List of American Football League players

1938 births
Living people
American football defensive backs
Oregon Ducks football players
St. Louis Cardinals (football) players
Buffalo Bills players
Denver Broncos (AFL) players
New York Jets players
Miami Dolphins players
American Football League All-Star players
American Football League players
People from Lexington, Mississippi

San Diego High School alumni